"Como Le Gusta a Tu Cuerpo" is a Latin pop song by Colombian recording artist Carlos Vives featuring the Brazilian musician Michel Teló. It was released on January 21, 2013 as the second single of the recently released album Corazón Profundo. The song features lyrics in both Spanish and Portuguese.

Chart performance
"Como Le Gusta A Tu Cuerpo" debuted at the top of the National-Report chart dated on the week of January 21, 2013, due to the strong radio airplay and debuted at #14 in Venezuela, on May 11, 2013 the song top the charts on Venezuela being the first number on hit for Teló and the second for Vives. The single has peaked at #3 on the US Billboard Latin Songs chart. In Mexico the song debuted at #20, peaked three weeks after at #16.

Music video 
On 2 April, Vives upload a picture via Facebook where he was accompanied of Michel Teló in a beach of San Andrés, the caption of the picture explains the fact of their reunion, playing some football and record a new music video. A behind the scenes of the music video was uploaded on April 12 through Vives' YouTube VEVO channel. The video was filmed in an exclusive area of San Andrés, under direction of Jessy Terrero who also directed many videos of international artists as Daddy Yankee, Wisin & Yandel, Enrique Iglesias and many others. The music video was premiered on 16 April 2013 on YouTube and VEVO. The video stars Vives and Teló, as well as Colombian top model and ex-Miss San Andrés Laura Archbold.

Track listing

Charts

Weekly charts

Year-end charts

Release history

See also 
 List of number-one songs of 2013 (Colombia)
List of Billboard number-one Latin songs of 2013

References 

2013 singles
2013 songs
Carlos Vives songs
Michel Teló songs
Spanish-language songs
Portuguese-language songs
Number-one singles in Colombia
Record Report Top 100 number-one singles
Record Report Top Latino number-one singles
Music videos directed by Jessy Terrero
Songs written by Carlos Vives
Songs written by Andrés Castro
Sony Music Latin singles
Male vocal duets